is a station operated by the West Japan Railway Company (JR West) and Hiroshima Rapid Transit. It is located in Ōmachi-higashi, Asaminami-ku, Hiroshima, Hiroshima Prefecture, Japan. The Kabe Line and the Astram Line stop at this station, though they are situated in separate station buildings. An overpass connects the two buildings together.

Lines
Ōmachi Station is served by the following lines:
  JR West
  Kabe Line
 Hiroshima Rapid Transit
  Astram Line

Station layout

Kabe Line

The Kabe Line station features one side platform serving one bidirectional track. The station did not exist during the line's opening; it was infilled during construction of the Astram Line in order to allow transfers between the two. The station is on ground level, however as the track is on an embankment, passengers must climb some stairs in order to reach the platform. A ticket office is available at this station. Unlike most stations on the Kabe Line, this station has ticket gates.

Platforms

Astram Line

The Astram Line station building features one elevated island platform serving two tracks. A headshunt is located north-west of the station, and some trains in the morning use this to short turn at this station. The station has a color designation of yellowish-green.

Platforms

History
The station was opened during the Astram Line opening on 20 August 1994. The Kabe Line station opened at the same time, in order to allow transfers between the two lines.

Surrounding Area
Sanyō Expressway Interchange
 Japan National Route 54
Ōmachi Bus Terminal
Hiroshima Ōmachi Post Office

References

External links

 JR West

Railway stations in Hiroshima Prefecture
Railway stations in Japan opened in 1994
Kabe Line
Hiroshima City Network
Stations of West Japan Railway Company in Hiroshima city
Astram Line stations